East Longmeadow High School is a public high school located in East Longmeadow, Massachusetts, United States. It is the only secondary school (high school) in the East Longmeadow School District. It enrolls 833 students. It is known for being one of the highest ranked high schools in the state of Massachusetts.

Notable alumni
 Nick Ahmed, professional baseball player
 Kyle Smith, (Class of '84) film critic for the Wall Street Journal and novelist.
 Victoria Aveyard, author of the Red Queen trilogy.

References

Schools in Hampden County, Massachusetts
Public high schools in Massachusetts
Educational institutions established in 1961
1961 establishments in Massachusetts
East Longmeadow, Massachusetts